United Daily News (UDN) is a newspaper published in Taiwan. It is considered to support the pan-Blue Coalition in its editorials.

History
UDN was founded in 1951 by Wang Tiwu as a merger of three newspapers, Popular Daily (全民日報), National (民族報), and the Economic Times (經濟時報). The three newspapers formally merged in 1953. In terms of political orientation, the United Daily News is regarded as taking an editorial line that supports the pan-Blue Coalition. Before Taiwan democratized, it was an opponent of political reform; in the years since Taiwan has democratized, it has advocated policies encouraging cooperation with the mainland.
It is the third-biggest newspaper in Taiwan, ranking after the Liberty Times and the Apple Daily.

The evening edition of the paper, the United Evening News, was first published on February 22, 1968. The evening paper shut down after publishing its final issue on June 1, 2020.

Contents

UDN was and to some extent still is a place to publish literature in the Lianhe Fukan literary supplement.

In editorial style and standards, UDN is one of the most literary of Taiwan's newspapers; the Chinese used is Written vernacular Chinese|baihua vernacular, but heavily incorporates usages from classical wenyan Chinese. Once praised for its high standards, UDN has faced stiff competition in recent years, resulting in lowered readership and less money available for proof-reading.

UDN has spawned a group of newspapers, including UDN evening edition and UDN international edition, including an American edition published with the Chinese-American audience in mind.

Staff

The publisher is currently owned by Wang Tiwu's daughter, Wang Shaw-lan.

General editors over the years, installed on September 16, the anniversary of UDN's founding:
Guan Jiemin (關潔民) 1951-
Liu Changping (劉昌平) 1953-
Ma Keren (馬克任) 1964-
Wang Jipu (王繼樸) 1971-
Zhang Zuojin (張作錦) 1975-
Zhao Yuming (趙玉明) 1981-
Liu Guorui (劉國瑞) 1984-
Huang Nian (黃年) 1988-
Hu Litai (胡立台) 1990-
Zhang Yidong (張逸東) 1993-
Shuang Guoning (項國寧) 1996-
Huang Sujuan (黃素娟) 2001-
Lo Kuo-Chun (羅國俊) 2008-
You Mei-Yue (游美月) 2012-
Hsiao Heng-Chien (蕭衡倩) 2016-

See also

 Media of Taiwan

References

Further reading
 De-Westernizing Media Studies, by Myung-Jin Park, James Curran, Routledge, 2000.

Chinese-language newspapers (Traditional Chinese)
Mass media in Taipei
Newspapers published in Taiwan
Publications established in 1951
1951 establishments in Taiwan
Conservatism in Taiwan